Phostria regalis is a moth in the family Crambidae. It was described by Arthur Gardiner Butler in 1882. It is found in Papua New Guinea.

References

Moths described in 1882
Phostria
Moths of New Guinea